The Kegelhelm (German: "cone helm") or Kegel type is a type of helmet. It is an open-faced helmet of roughly conical shape, sometimes with extensions at the sides to protect the cheeks, or a crest-holder on top. It was made of bronze, sometimes in several pieces. It was the progenitor of many Greek helmets, especially the "Illyrian" type helmet. It did not outlast the eighth century BC.

Related reading 
Peter Connoly, Greece & Rome at War,

References

External links
A Kegelhelm from the 8th century B.C.

Ancient Greek helmets